The Dendora Valley is a small valley on the Gila River west of Painted Rock Dam and Reservoir, Arizona, United States. The valley is north of the river, and is the valley west of the north–south Painted Rock Mountains which form the western end of the Painted Rock Reservoir.

The Gila Bend Mountains form the northern border from east to west, of both Dendora Valley, and the Painted Rock Reservoir adjacent eastwards; this is the famous Gila Bend formed by the Gila River as it changes direction to south, then west entering the reservoir.

References

External links
 Oatman Mountain, (southwest Dendora Valley) coordinates: 33,03,06.1-N, 113,08,05.6

Gila River
Valleys of Arizona
Landforms of Maricopa County, Arizona